Adityavarman is a given name. Notable people with the name include:

 Adityavarman (Chalukya dynasty), 7th-century ruler of Vatapi in India
 Adityawarman (1294–1375), ruler of Malayapura in Sumatra

Masculine given names